Sekou Lumumba is a Canadian musician, based in Toronto, who has been drummer for such artists and groups as Ben Kenney, The Illegal Jazz Poets, Thornley, Edwin & the Pressure, Goodbye Glory, Ivana Santilli, Kardinal Offishall, Serena Ryder, 24-7 Spyz and Bedouin Soundclash.

Lumumba reunited in 2021 with former Thornley bandmate and frontman Ian Thornley as the new drummer of Big Wreck.

References 

Canadian rock drummers
Canadian male drummers
Black Canadian musicians
Living people
Year of birth missing (living people)
Canadian alternative rock musicians
Thornley (band) members